United Nations Security Council Resolution 161 was adopted on February 21, 1961. After noting the killings of Patrice Lumumba, Maurice Mpolo and Joseph Okito and a report of the Secretary-General's Special Representative, the Council urged the United Nations to immediately take measures to prevent the occurrence of civil war in the Congo, even if the use of force is necessary. The Council further urged the withdrawal of all Belgian and other foreign military, paramilitary personnel and mercenaries not with the UN and called upon all states to take measures to deny transport and other facilities to such personnel moving into the Congo.  The Council also decided that it would launch an investigation into the death of Lumumba and his colleagues promising punishment to the perpetrators.

The resolution was approved by nine votes to none; France and the Soviet Union abstained.

See also
List of United Nations Security Council Resolutions 101 to 200 (1953–1965)
Resolutions 143, 145, 146, 157,  and 169
The Congo Crisis
History of Katanga

References
Text of the Resolution at undocs.org

External links
 

 0161
 0161
 0161
1961 in the Republic of the Congo (Léopoldville)
1961 in Belgium
February 1961 events